Uralsky Trubnik Stadium is a sports venue in Pervouralsk, the only one in the Russian Bandy Super League without  artificial ice. It is the home of SKA-Sverdlovsk and Uralsky Trubnik.

References

Bandy venues in Russia
Sport in Sverdlovsk Oblast